Neotemnopteryx fulva is a species from the genus Neotemnopteryx.

References

Cockroaches